The 1949–50 season was the 70th season of competitive football by Rangers.

Overview
Rangers played a total of 47 competitive matches during the 1949–50 season. The side won the league with a one-point lead over second placed Hibernian, after winning 22 of the 30 matches. The side also recorded an unbeaten home record in the league.

In the cup competitions Rangers were successful. The Scottish Cup was won thanks to a 3–0 win over East Fife with goals from Willie Findlay and a brace from Willie Thornton. The club exited the League Cup at the semi-final stage to East Fife.

Results
All results are written with Rangers' score first.

Scottish League Division A

Scottish Cup

League Cup

Appearances

See also
 1949–50 in Scottish football
 1949–50 Scottish Cup
 1949–50 Scottish League Cup

References 

Rangers F.C. seasons
Rangers
Scottish football championship-winning seasons